USS LST-923 was an  in the United States Navy. Like many of her class, she was not named and is properly referred to by her hull designation.

Construction
LST-923 was laid down on 3 May 1944, at Hingham, Massachusetts, by the Bethlehem-Hingham Shipyard; launched on 11 June 1944; and commissioned on 6 July 1944.

Service history
During World War II, LST-923 was assigned to the Asiatic-Pacific theater. She took part in the Lingayen Gulf landings in January 1945, and the assault and occupation of Okinawa Gunto in April and June 1945.

Following the war, she performed occupation duty in the Far East until early April 1946. Upon her return to the United States, she was decommissioned on 10 July 1946, and struck from the Navy list on 15 August, that same year. The ship was sold on 31 May 1948, to the Bethlehem Steel Co., Bethlehem, Pennsylvania, for scrapping.

Awards
LST-923 earned two battle star for World War II service.

Notes

Citations

Bibliography 

Online resources

External links
 

 

LST-542-class tank landing ships
World War II amphibious warfare vessels of the United States
Ships built in Hingham, Massachusetts
1944 ships